The Jejuy River, a tributary of Paraguay River, is a river in Paraguay. Located in the San Pedro Department, it flows eastwards discharging to Paraguay River north of Asunción. Aracaré was said to be from the Jejuy River.

See also
List of rivers of Paraguay

References

Rivers of Paraguay
Tributaries of the Paraguay River